Akademiks (an intentional misspelling of "academics") is an American brand of streetwear clothing popular with devotees of hip hop music, art and fashion. The label was founded by two brothers, Donwan and Emmett Harrell, along with a group of partners.

Akademiks has collaborated with Dutchess and Ceaser, the stars of VH1's Black Ink Crew, on a line of streetwear and hats.

Akademiks has gained popularity in the clothing industry due to the number of celebrities who wear the brand.

Background
In 1999, the Harrell brothers founded Akademiks with the aid of Elliot Betesh, a co-founder of Dr. Jay's clothing stores. The name Akademiks was based on their conviction that education is essential.

Notes

Clothing companies of the United States
Hip hop fashion
Clothing brands of the United States
Clothing companies established in 1999
Retail companies established in 1999